Ranchpar is a village in the Masis Municipality of the Ararat Province of Armenia near the Armenia–Turkey border. The village consists mostly of Armenians with a Yazidi minority. Footballer and member of the Armenia national football team, Ishkhan Geloyan was born in Ranchpar.

References

External links 

World Gazeteer: Armenia – World-Gazetteer.com

Populated places in Ararat Province
Yazidi populated places in Armenia